Cowboy Crush is an American country music band signed to Curb Records' Asylum/Curb division. The group is composed of Trenna Barnes (lead vocals), Debbie Johnson (bass guitar, vocals), Becky Priest (keyboards, vocals), and Renaé Truex (fiddle, mandolin). Until 2006, Darla Perlozzi (drums) was also a member of the group. Perlozzi co-wrote Big & Rich's 2007 single "Loud".

All five founding members of Cowboy Crush had previously worked throughout Nashville, Tennessee before meeting at Belmont University. They held their first practice together in a garage on March 18, 2003. Cowboy Crush is also known for its high-energy concerts and backstage antics. The group's debut single, "Nobody Ever Died of a Broken Heart", was previously recorded by Trick Pony. Cowboy Crush's debut album was released to digital retailers on July 14, 2009.

Discography

Studio albums

Singles

Music videos

References

External links
Official website
Official Trenna Barnes website

All-female bands
Country music groups from Tennessee
Curb Records artists
Musical groups established in 2003
Musical groups from Nashville, Tennessee